The epoophoron or epoöphoron (also called organ of Rosenmüller or the parovarium) is a remnant of the mesonephric tubules that can be found  next to the ovary and fallopian tube.

Anatomy
It may contain 10–15 transverse small ducts or tubules that lead to the Gartner’s duct (also longitudinal duct of epoophoron) that represents the caudal remnant of the mesonephric duct and  passes through the broad ligament and the lateral wall of the cervix and vagina.

The epoophoron is a homologue to the epididymis in the male.

While the epoophoron is located in the lateral portion of the mesosalpinx and mesovarium, the paroophoron (residual remnant of that part of the mesonephric duct that forms the paradidymis in the male) lies more medially in the mesosalpinx.

Histology
It has a unique histological profile.

Clinical significance
Clinically the organ may give rise to a local paraovarian cyst or adenoma.

See also
 List of homologues of the human reproductive system
 Vesicular appendages of epoophoron

References

External links
 
 
 

Mammal female reproductive system